The Sri Lankan cricket team toured Bangladesh for cricket matches during the 2005–06 season. The Sri Lankans rested many senior players on this tour, like Chaminda Vaas, Muttiah Muralitharan (Muttiah was only left out of the ODI squad) and the captain Marvan Attapatu. The role of the captain for this series was taken over by Mahela Jayawardene. The first match of the ODI series was the last game for veteran fast bowler Khaled Mahmud.

Squads

ODI series

1st ODI

2nd ODI

3rd ODI

Test series

1st Test

2nd Test

2006 in Bangladeshi cricket
2005-06
Bangladeshi cricket seasons from 2000–01
2006 in Sri Lankan cricket
International cricket competitions in 2005–06